The Hard Swing is an album by saxophonist Sonny Stitt's Quartet recorded in 1959 and released on the Verve label.

Reception
The Allmusic site awarded the album 3 stars.

Track listing 
 "I Got Rhythm" (George Gershwin, Ira Gershwin) - 3:07    
 "What's New?" (Bob Haggart, Johnny Burke) - 3:41    
 "Subito" - 3:57 
 "If I Had You" (Irving King, Ted Shapiro) - 4:08    
 "I'll Remember April" (Don Raye, Gene de Paul, Patricia Johnston) - 4:36    
 "Blues for Lester" - 4:24    
 "After You've Gone" (Henry Creamer, Turner Layton) - 3:47  
 "Street of Dreams" (Sam M. Lewis, Victor Young) - 2:41   
 "The Way You Look Tonight" (Dorothy Fields, Jerome Kern) - 5:03    
 "Presto" - 3:27 
 "Tune Up" (Miles Davis) - 4:07

Personnel 
Sonny Stitt Quartet 
Sonny Stitt -  alto saxophone (on 7 tracks); tenor saxophone (on 4 tracks)
Amos Trice - piano
George Morrow - bass
Lenny McBrowne - drums
Technical
Sheldon Marks - art direction
Norman Gollin - cover design
Tommy Mitchell - cover photography

References 

1959 albums
Verve Records albums
Sonny Stitt albums